Animal toilet may refer to:

Animal latrine, wildlife dedicated defecation site
Litter box, pet defecation site
Animal grooming; see Groom (disambiguation)